Coláiste an Spioraid Naoimh is an Irish boys' secondary school founded under the patronage of the Presentation Brothers. It is located in Bishopstown, Cork, Ireland.

History
Coláiste an Spioraid Naoimh is a non-fee-paying, Catholic, all-boys school in Bishopstown, Cork. It was founded by Brother Bonaventure of the Presentation Brothers in 1964. The Brothers withdrew from direct management in 1992 but continued their involvement until 2009, when they handed the trusteeship over to the Presentation Brothers School Trust. The school was originally located in Laburnum House, Model Farm Road, and the new school building opened in 1971.

Sports and societies
Basketball began in Coláiste an Spioraid Naoimh in the mid-1980s, and the school won All-Ireland Titles in 1991, 1995, 2005, and 2009. CSN was also named Basketball School of the Year in 2009, and a number of CSN players have played for Irish underage teams.

In Gaelic football, the school has won the Cork Colleges Senior A competition, and in 2005 won the Corn Uí Mhuirí. The school enters teams for Cork Colleges and Munster Colleges competitions.

Hurling is also played at the school, and a team from the school won the Munster B hurling championship in 1991 and subsequently participated in the All Ireland final. Among the CSN hurlers who have gone on to play at inter-county level are Brian Murphy (who played senior football with Kildare) and Ronan Curran (a former member of the Cork senior hurling panel).

The school has one of the oldest mountaineering clubs in Cork, founded in 1972.

Other societies in the school include a creative writing club and the drama club. 
The school also has a debating society, which regularly participates in competitions across Cork. In 1998, the debating society produced the first Irish team to win the UK and Ireland Observer Mace debating competition.

Alumni
 Rubyhorse - band formed in Coláiste an Spioriad Naoimh. Members included David Farrell, Joe Philpott, Declan Lucey, Owen Fegan and Colum Young. 
 Owen Fegan - musician and photographer
 John Spillane - folk singer
 Louis de Paor - poet
 Brendan O'Connor - RTÉ media personality, columnist, and comedian
 Philip King - musician, broadcaster and film maker.
 James O'Sullivan - writer and academic

Sports
 Jimmy Barry-Murphy - former association footballer, hurler, Gaelic footballer, and manager of the Cork senior hurling team
 Damien Cahalane - Cork dual player
 Conor Cahalane - Cork dual player 
 Patrick Collins - Cork hurler
 Ger Collins - Cork hurler
 Ken O'Halloran - Gaelic footballer
 Neal Horgan - association footballer
 Michael Shields - Gaelic footballer
 Tim Ryan - rugby union player
 Dave Ryan - rugby union player
 Jamie O'Sullivan - Gaelic footballer
 John Egan - association footballer
 Conor Dorman - Gaelic footballer
 Ian Maguire - Gaelic footballer

References

External links 
 

Boys' schools in the Republic of Ireland
Presentation Brothers schools
Irish-language schools and college
Secondary schools in County Cork
1964 establishments in Ireland
Educational institutions established in 1964